Philip Levine (August 10, 1900 – October 18, 1987) was an immuno-hematologist whose clinical research advanced knowledge on the Rhesus factor, Hemolytic disease of the newborn (HDN) and blood transfusion.

Life and career 
Levine was born in Kletsk, near Minsk (now in Belarus), then in the Russian Empire.  He moved with his family to New York when he was 8 years old where his family took on a more English sounding surname. The family settled in Brooklyn where Levine
graduated from Boys' High School. He received a bachelor's degree at City College and a master's degree and, in 1923, an M.D. degree at Cornell University Medical School.
About 1925, Levine became assistant to Karl Landsteiner at the Rockefeller Institute, New York City. In 1932, he took up research work on the bacteriophage at the University of Wisconsin–Madison.
Back in the east in 1935, he worked as a bacteriologist and serologist at Newark Beth Israel Hospital, New Jersey where, in 1939, Levine and Rufus E. Stetson published their findings about a family who had a stillborn baby in 1937 who had died of hemolytic disease of the newborn.  This publication included the first suggestion that a mother could make blood group antibodies owing to immune sensitization to her fetus's red blood cells.
In 1944, Levine started a centre for blood group research at the Ortho Research Foundation, Raritan, New Jersey.

Awards 
Extract from the complete list of honors awarded to Levine in the Giblett publication on pp. 335f.

 1944: Fellow of the American College of Physicians
 1946: Albert Lasker Award for clinical research awarded to Levine jointly with Karl Landsteiner and Alexander Wiener for their work on the Rhesus factor, HDN and blood transfusion
 1951: Passano Foundation Award
 1956: AABB Karl Landsteiner Award
 1956: Townsend Harris Medal, Alumni Association of New York City College
 1959: Award of Merit of the Netherlands Red Cross
 1960: Johnson Medal for research and development in immunohematology
 1961: Life membership in the Harvey Society
 1964:First Franz Oehlecker Award from German Society for Blood Transfusion
 1965: Medal from German Red Cross
 1966: Elected to the National Academy of Sciences
 1966: Clemens von Pirquet Gold Medal from the 7th Forum on Allergy
 1967: Honorary Doctor of Science from Michigan State University
 1978: Honorary member of the International Society of Blood Transfusion
 1978: Honorary life member of the New York Academy of Sciences
 1980: Karl Landsteiner Gold Medal of Netherlands Red Cross
 1983: Honorary Doctor of Science, University of Wisconsin

Legacy
In 1969, the American Society for Clinical Pathology (ASCP) started an award for clinical research and named it the Philip Levine Award after Levine

See also
 History of medical advances in Rh disease

References

Further reading
 Eloise R. Giblett: Philip Levine (1900-1987), A Biographical Memoir, National Academy of Sciences, Washington D.C. 1994 PDF
 Levine P. and Stetson R. E: Intra-group agglutination. J Am Med Assoc, 113: 126,1939

External links
 History of neonatology
 Lasker Foundation webpage about the 1946 Clinical Research Award
 Levine's obituary in the New York Times
 Detailed coverage of Levine's research on the Rh factor here at Lasker Foundation website
 National Academy of Sciences Biographical Memoir

American hematologists
1900 births
1987 deaths
Weill Cornell Medical College alumni
Emigrants from the Russian Empire to the United States
Members of the United States National Academy of Sciences
City College of New York alumni
American bacteriologists
20th-century American scientists
Recipients of the Lasker-DeBakey Clinical Medical Research Award